Guilt Machine is a musical project by Dutch musician Arjen Anthony Lucassen, owner of other musical projects such as Star One, Ayreon and Ambeon. The project's debut release, On This Perfect Day, was released in August 2009.

Biography

Background 
In February 2009, Arjen announced on his website that he would be working on his new side project Guilt Machine. This project features a very limited line-up, comparing to other Arjen's side projects: Arjen Lucassen on the instruments and backing vocals, Jasper Steverlinck (Arid) on lead vocals, Chris Maitland (ex-Porcupine Tree) on drums and Lori Linstruth (ex-Stream of Passion) on lead guitar.

On 9 March, Arjen announced that fans would be able to submit their own recorded material for a possible inclusion on the project. The material had to be sent in the form of a brief audio message containing the person's thoughts in his/her mother language, with a translation. The deadline for submission was on 15 March.

Recently, Arjen has signed a deal with Mascot Records.

Together with the announcement of the signing with Mascot Records at his official website, Arjen reported that more than 200 audio messages were sent, but only 19 would be included on the album.  According to him, the languages range from Chinese to Tagalog and from French to Russian.

He informed that the album will include an eight-minute instrumental track filled with as many messages as he could have used (although many recordings would still remain unused).

On This Perfect Day 
On 23 June 2009, Lucassen announced the release of Guilt Machine's first release, On This Perfect Day. It was released on 28 August in Germany, Austria and Switzerland, on 31 August in the rest of Europe, and on 29 September in the US. Most of the songs are relatively long, the shortest lasting 6:11. Limited and Special editions were released, the limited edition contained a 32-page digibook and a DVD and the special edition came with a Digipack 24-page booklet and a DVD.

Regarding a future album of the project, Arjen stated in 2009 that "we definitely want to make another Guilt Machine album.". In a Q&A in August 2018, he stated "I would love to do another Guilt Machine because I'm extremely proud of [On This Perfect Day] [...] Lori wrote the lyrics and she did an amazing job. I'd love to do another Guilt Machine but it would probably be with different people. Again, you know, not everyone is available anymore. But yeah, it's definitely an option. It's not a plan yet, but it's definitely an option."

Musical style 
According to Arjen, the music will range "from dark and heavy to atmospheric and melancholic".  Regarding the concept, Arjen stated that instead of fantasy and science fiction themes, Guilt Machine will explore "the destructive psychology of guilt, regret and the darkest form of secret -- the secrets we hide from ourselves."  In spite of the differences, the songs are expected to keep the dynamic contrasts, intricated harmonies, complex rhythms and soaring melodies of any Ayreon release.

Although Jasper and his band are from the alternative rock genre, he was convinced by Arjen to work on this progressive metal project. Arjen has stated:

Instead of working with Ed Warby, the drummer that performed in most of Ayreon albums, Arjen chose Chris Maitland, which, according to him, "was the ideal choice this time, having both the power for the heavy sections and the subtle touch needed in the more atmospheric parts".

Lori Linstruth, the lead guitarist and manager, pleased Arjen with her lyrics:

Personnel 
 Jasper Steverlinck (Arid) – lead vocals
 Arjen Anthony Lucassen (Ayreon/Ambeon/Star One/ex-Stream of Passion) – guitar, bass, keyboards, various instruments, backing vocals
 Lori Linstruth (ex-Stream of Passion) – lead guitar
 Chris Maitland (ex-Porcupine Tree) – drums

Discography 
On This Perfect Day (full-length, 2009, Mascot Records)

References

External links 
 Audio Interview with Arjen Lucassen and Lori Linstruth regarding Guilt Machine conducted by Ragnarok Radio
 Interview with Arjen on Lebmetal.com October 2009

Arjen Anthony Lucassen
Musical groups established in 2009
Heavy metal supergroups
Dutch progressive metal musical groups
2009 establishments in the Netherlands
Musical quartets